Joe Witte (born 1943) is currently an Outreach Specialist for Aquent, a contractor of  Jet Propulsion Laboratory, NASA. He adapts science content for use by 2,000 television meteorologists around the country.

Joe Witte started his career as a glaciologist for the USGS, working on the ice of South Cascade Glacier, in the northern Cascades of Washington State, as well as the Nisqually Glacier of Mt. Rainier and Blue Glacier on Mt. Olympus. He was the principal investigator on ice island T-3 in the Arctic Ocean studying the Greenhouse infrared radiation budget as well as the ice crystals of the Arctic clouds, winter and summers. Next was 1 year at the Geophysical Fluid Dynamics Laboratory at Princeton, where original climate change computer modeling was created. Witte left television in 2010 with 2 local TV Emmys (NYC Blizzard coverage and Wash.DC hurricane coverage) after a  career of 4 decades as a meteorologist. He started TV in 1970 in Seattle, Washington at KING-TV. 
Witte has worked for WCBS-TV, WABC-TV, and WNBC-TV in New York City, as well as at stations in Seattle, Milwaukee and Philadelphia. While at WNBC-TV, he was the longtime weatherman on the morning program Today in New York. Witte served as the weatherman for the former NBC News program NBC News at Sunrise from 1983 to 1999, and as the weatherman for Sunday Today from 1992 to 1995.  Witte has also filled in for John Coleman on ABC's Good Morning America, and for Willard Scott, and Al Roker on NBC's Today. He helped make John Coleman's beta project tape for the initial Weather Channel.  Witte then served 4 years reporting on the weather's effects on the business world for CNBC from 1999 to 2003.  He performed voiceover work for sponsor idents that appeared before various  segments of NBC's Today.

Witte has often reported on NBC Nightly News and Dateline NBC as a weather expert and was chief meteorologist for NBC's Super Channel NBC Asia, and NBC Europe. He has also made appearances as a meteorologist on MSNBC.  Witte was on the air non-stop for Hurricane Gloria in 1985, and also for the Blizzard of 1996 for over eight hours each for both events. Local Emmys for Blizzard of 1996 and 2003's Hurricane Isabel are among his awards.

Joe is a Fellow of the American Meteorological Society as well as of The Explorers Club.

Notes and references

1943 births
Living people
Television meteorologists from New York (state)
Television meteorologists in New York City
Television anchors from New York City
Television anchors from Washington, D.C.
NBC News people
CNBC people
Television meteorologists in Washington, D.C.
Scientists from New York (state)
Fellows of the American Meteorological Society